Adh Dhuhaybah  is a town in the Amman Governorate of northern Jordan.

References

External links
Satellite map at Maplandia.com Note that the town is located on the rim of what may be a meteorite impact crater. [Zoom-in five clicks for best view.] 18 October 2010

Villages in Amman governorate